The Myth of Monogamy: Fidelity and Infidelity in Animals and People is a 2001 book by psychologist David P. Barash and psychiatrist Judith Eve Lipton.

Summary
Barash and Lipton argue that monogamy is rare in nature. They also compare the sexual behavior of humans with that of other animals.

References

2001 non-fiction books
Non-fiction books about sexuality